John G. Faulkner (born August 20, 1965) is a Democratic member of the Mississippi House of Representatives, having represented the 5th District since 2014.

Biography 
John G. Faulkner was born on August 20, 1965. He graduated from Holly Springs High School, the Army School of Nursing, and Strayer University. He is a youth counselor by occupation. He began representing Mississippi's 5th House district, composed of Benton, Lafayette, Marshall, and Tate Counties, in the Mississippi House of Representatives as a Democrat in 2014.

References 

1965 births
Living people
People from Holly Springs, Mississippi
Democratic Party members of the Mississippi House of Representatives